RMS Parthia was the second of two all first class transatlantic passenger cargo liners built for the Cunard Line. She later served on the London to Auckland route for the New Zealand Shipping Company under the name Remuera, and still later as a Pacific cruise ship under the name Aramac. She was scrapped in 1969–70.

History
Originally conceived as cargo ships for the Cunard Line subsidiary - Brocklebank Line, RMS Parthia and her sister RMS Media were completed as transatlantic passenger cargo ships that served the Cunard Line on its Liverpool to New York route from 1948 until 1961. Smaller and somewhat slower than the great express liners, Parthia acquired a reputation for informal elegance and comfort that made her a favourite with many of the travelling public. Among the celebrities who frequently sailed with the ship or her sister ship , was the film star Katharine Hepburn. As originally constructed the ship had four passenger decks and included all of the normal amenities expected by her 251 all first class passengers, including stylish lounges, a cocktail bar, library, and spacious staterooms. The limited number of passengers also meant more shipboard space for promenading and other activities which in turn contributed to a more relaxed ambiance. Unfortunately, Parthia and Media were poor sea boats and were eventually fitted with Denny-Brown stabilisers, Media in 1952 and Parthia in 1954, the first transatlantic liners to be so fitted

With the arrival of the 1960s however, commercial jet planes began to dominate the transatlantic passenger trade and steamship companies increasingly found it difficult to compete. On 16 October 1961 Parthia was withdrawn from service after her final arrival at Liverpool. She was purchased for £705,000 by the P&O group, largely it was thought to prevent her falling into the hands of a competitor as had happened to the Media. P&O allocated the ship to its New Zealand Shipping Company subsidiary which employed the ship, renamed SS Remuera, on the London to Auckland New Zealand route. The ship was refitted at the Alexander Stephen shipyard on the Clyde as a one class ship for 350 passengers, replacing the 33-year-old Rangitiki and Rangitata. Again however, the ship was a financial millstone to her owners, being a steamship in a fleet of motor ships. In 1964 P&O transferred her to another subsidiary, the Eastern and Australian Steamship Company. Renamed Aramac the ship was converted for cruising and served in this capacity until 1969 when she was definitively withdrawn from service and sold for scrap which was completed in Taiwan in 1970.

References

External links
RMS Parthia on Chris' Cunard Page: https://www.chriscunard.com/history-fleet/cunard-fleet/1930-1960/parthia/

1947 ships
Cargo liners
Ocean liners of the United Kingdom
Cruise ships of the United Kingdom
Ships of the Cunard Line
Steamships of the United Kingdom
Passenger ships of the United Kingdom
Ships of the New Zealand Shipping Company
Ships built in Belfast
Ships built by Harland and Wolff